Francis Davison (1919–1984) was a British visual artist and painter. His later work, starting shortly after his marriage to Margaret Mellis in 1948, is characterised by the use of collage: coloured printed paper layered and mounted on board. Davison remained in relative obscurity until finding recognition in the late 1970s and early 80s. He died in 1984.

References

Further reading 
 Davison, Francis, Hayward Gallery, and Arts Council of Great Britain. Francis Davison: Paper Collages: 10 February to 17 April 1983, Hayward Gallery, London. London: Arts Council of Great Britain, 1983. Print. .
 Davison, Francis, Lewis, Adrian, and Goldmark Gallery. Francis Davison, 1919–1984 / Essay by Adrian Lewis. Uppingham: Goldmark Gallery, 2010. Print. .
 Lambirth, Andrew. Francis Davison. Catalogue. London: Antique Collectors Club Limited, 2013. 
 Lambirth, Andrew. Francis Davison - Collages. Catalogue. London: Redfern Gallery, 2017. 
 Spalding, Julian. Francis Davison, by Andrew Lambirth. The Spectator. 9666 (2013): p. 50. Print. Journal ISSN: 0038-6952

1919 births
1984 deaths
Collage artists
English painters